Dejani may refer to:
 a village in the municipality of Recea, Brașov, Romania
 Deh Jani, a village in Iran